Dreamtime is a Big Finish Productions audio drama based on the long-running British science fiction television series Doctor Who.

Plot
The TARDIS brings the Seventh Doctor, Ace and new companion Hex to a seemingly dead city floating among the stars, populated by statues that may once have been people. Most startling of all on the planetoid is the familiar sight of Uluru — Ayers Rock — the heart of the Dreamtime.

Cast
The Doctor — Sylvester McCoy
Ace — Sophie Aldred
Hex — Philip Olivier
Trade Negotiator Vresha — Tamzin Griffin
Co-Ordinator Whitten — Jef Higgins
Dream Commando Wahn — Brigid Lohrey
Toomey — Josephine Mackerras
Dream Commando Mulyan — Andrew Peisley
Commander Korshal — Steffan Rhodri
Baiame — John Scholes

Continuity
The Sixth Doctor met the Galyari in The Sandman.  They also appear in the Bernice Summerfield story The Bone of Contention.

External links
Big Finish Productions – Dreamtime

2005 audio plays
Seventh Doctor audio plays